Gray-la-Ville is a commune in the Haute-Saône department, region of Bourgogne-Franche-Comté, eastern France.

See also
Communes of the Haute-Saône department

References

Communes of Haute-Saône